Superfast is an adjective that means "Relating to or being a pulsar that rotates many times per second." However it's often commonly used as synonym to "super-fast".

Superfast can also refer to:

Arts and entertainment
 Superfast!, a 2015 film
 Superfast (Dynamite Hack album), 2000
 "Superfast", a 2014 song by Hollie Cook on the album Twice

Other uses
 Superfast broadband, using optical fiber to provide all or part of the local loop used for last mile telecommunications
 Superfast Ferries, a Greece-based ferry company
 Superfast Express trains in India, Indian Railways
 Ferrari 812 Superfast

See also